NHK Hall is a part of the NHK Osaka, located in Otemae, Chūō-ku, Osaka, Japan. Its address is 4-1-20, Chūō-ku, Osaka, 540-8501. This facility has a 1,417-seat capacity.

See also 
NHK Hall

References

External links 
 Official Site

Theatres in Japan
Concert halls in Japan
Osaka Hall
Buildings and structures in Osaka
Tourist attractions in Osaka
Mass media in Osaka
Music venues completed in 2001
Theatres completed in 2001
2001 establishments in Japan
Chūō-ku, Osaka